Mohamed Lakhdar Maougal is an Algerian philosopher. A specialist in the philosophy of language and sociolinguistics, he is the author of several books, including studies of Kateb Yacine and Albert Camus.

References

External links
Official site 

Algerian philosophers
Living people
Year of birth missing (living people)
21st-century Algerian people